Dean Neville Towers (born 4 May 1990) is a former Australian rules footballer who played for the Sydney Swans in the Australian Football League (AFL).

AFL career
Towers was drafted with the 22nd pick in 2012 AFL Draft. He debuted in round 17, 2014 against the Carlton Football Club. and was delisted at the end of the 2018 AFL season.

In 2019, Towers became a player and head coach with the UNSW-Eastern Suburbs Bulldogs in the Sydney AFL competition.

Personal life
Towers was born in Perth and spent his early years there before his family returned to Victoria.  He grew up on a beef farm in Kawarren and attended Sacred Heart School and Elliminyt Primary School prior to spending his secondary schooling years at Colac Secondary College. He was a 3rd year undergraduate student in Physical Education (Teaching) at the University of Ballarat at the time he was drafted. He has two siblings, a brother Ryan and a sister Breanna. Towers' family were originally fans of Geelong Football Club but changed to following the Sydney Football Club when the Swans drafted Towers. Dean's brother Ryan quotes that "Yeah I'd say that we're converts now but I've still got a soft spot for Geelong."

In 2019, Towers was studying for a degree in Exercise Physiology at UNSW, with Towers completing his studies in 2022. He lives with his wife Jessica.

References

External links

1990 births
Australian rules footballers from Victoria (Australia)
Living people
Sydney Swans players
Greater Western Victoria Rebels players
Geelong Falcons players
Colac Football Club players
North Ballarat Football Club players